The 2006 African Men's Handball Championship was the 17th edition of the African Men's Handball Championship, held in Tunis and Radès, Tunisia, from 10 to 20 January 2006. It acted as the African qualifying tournament for the 2007 World Championship in Germany.

Tunisia win their seventh title beating Egypt in the final game 26–21.

Venues

Qualified teams

First round
All times are local (UTC+1).

Group A

Group B

Group C

Group D

Second round

Group E

Group F

Placement matches

Group 9–11th place

Seventh place match

Fifth place match

Knockout stage

Semifinals

Third place game

Final

 Tunisia: Wissem Hmam 9, Heykel Megannem 6, Wissem Bousnina 3, Marouen Belhadj 3, Sabhi Ben Aziza 2, Issam Tej 1, Anouar Ayed 1, Mahmoud Gharbi 1
 Egypt: Ahmed El-Ahmar 6, Sayed 3, Mohamed Keshk 4, Awad 3, Hassan Yousry 1, Abdelfarès 2, Alam 2.

Final ranking

References

African handball championships
Handball
A
Handball
Handball in Tunisia
African Men's Handball Championship, 2006
African Men's Handball Championship